Toxochitona vansomereni is a butterfly in the family Lycaenidae. It is found in Uganda (from the south-western part of the country to the Kigezi District).

References

Endemic fauna of Uganda
Butterflies described in 1954
Poritiinae